Namibiana rostrata, also known as Bocage's blind snake or Angolan beaked threadsnake, is a species of snake in the family Leptotyphlopidae. It is endemic to Angola.

References

Namibiana
Snakes of Africa
Reptiles of Angola
Endemic fauna of Angola
Reptiles described in 1886
Taxa named by José Vicente Barbosa du Bocage